KGMO (100.7 FM) is a radio station broadcasting from Cape Girardeau, Missouri, and reaching portions of southern Illinois, Southeast Missouri, northeast Arkansas, the Missouri Bootheel, western Kentucky, and the northern portion of West Tennessee with its 100,000-watt signal.

Its current format is classic rock, although it has had an oldies format in the past.  At one time, KGMO had an AM sister station, KGMO (AM).  The AM station was where (politically) conservative radio & TV personality Rush Limbaugh got his first job as a disc jockey, in his hometown, but was fired after six months.  That station is now KAPE, which is affiliated with a majority of the Fox News and Fox Sports Radio programming.

External links
KGMO official website

GMO
Classic rock radio stations in the United States
Radio stations established in 1985
1985 establishments in Missouri